Mammillaria aureilanata is a species of plant in the family Cactaceae. It is endemic to Mexico.  Its natural habitat is hot deserts.

References

Cacti of Mexico
aureilanata
Vulnerable plants
Taxonomy articles created by Polbot